This is a list of electoral results for the Electoral district of Toodyay in Western Australian state elections.

Members for Toodyay

Election results

Elections in the 1970s

Elections in the 1960s 

 Two party preferred vote was estimated.

Elections in the 1950s

Elections in the 1940s

Elections in the 1930s

Elections in the 1920s

Elections in the 1910s

 Piesse's designation at the 1914 election was simply "Country", rather than "National Country".

Elections in the 1900s

Elections in the 1890s

References

Western Australian state electoral results by district